Robert Laurie may refer to:

People
 Robert Laurie (bishop) (died 1677), Scottish prelate, Bishop of Brechin
 Robert Laurie (engraver) (c. 1755–1836), British mezzotint engraver and publisher
 Robert Laurie (rugby league) (1955–2022), Australian sportsman
 Robert Peter Laurie (1835–1905), Member of Parliament for Canterbury (1879–1880) and Bath (1886–1892)
 Sir Robert Laurie, 4th Baronet (1708–1779), Member of Parliament for Dumfries Burghs
 Sir Robert Laurie, 5th Baronet (c. 1738–1804), Member of Parliament for Dumfriesshire
 Sir Robert Laurie, 6th Baronet (1764–1848), admiral in the Royal Navy
 Robert Douglas Laurie (1874–1953), founder and first president of the Association of University Teachers
 Robert Laurie (journalist), or Bobby Laurie, American travel expert

Fictional characters
 Robert Laurie, a character in the 1927 film Annie Laurie